The Department of Parks and Recreation (DPR), also known as Board of Parks and Recreation or Park Board, is used by many government bodies to describe the parts of their organizations that oversee public parks and recreational public works.

Organizations using these terms include:

Canada
Toronto Parks, Forestry and Recreation Division, Ontario
Vancouver Park Board, British Columbia

United States
Albany Parks & Recreation, Oregon
California Department of Parks and Recreation
City of Los Angeles Department of Recreation and Parks, California
Columbus Recreation and Parks Department, Ohio
Decatur Parks and Recreation, Alabama
Houston Parks and Recreation Department, Texas
Los Angeles County Department of Parks and Recreation, California
Maryland-National Capital Park and Planning Commission
Minneapolis Park and Recreation Board, Minnesota
Nashville Board of Parks and Recreation, Tennessee
Newport News Department of Parks, Recreation and Tourism, Virginia
New Orleans Recreation Department, Louisiana
New York City Department of Parks and Recreation
Omaha Department of Parks and Recreation, Nebraska
Oregon Parks and Recreation Department
Seattle Parks and Recreation, Washington
Tennessee Department of Environment and Conservation
Texas Parks and Wildlife Department
Utah Division of Parks and Recreation

See also
Department of Natural Resources (disambiguation)
Parks and Recreation, an American TV series
Park district